Mount LeResche is a prominent mountain (2,040 m) at the extreme north end of Homerun Range in the Admiralty Mountains, in the Victoria Land region of Antarctica. Mapped by the United States Geological Survey (USGS) from surveys and U.S. Navy aerial photography, 1960–63.

The range was named by the Advisory Committee on Antarctic Names (US-ACAN) for Robert E. LeResche, United States Antarctic Research Program (USARP) biologist at McMurdo Station and Cape Crozier, Ross Island, 1966–67, 1967–68 and 1968–69.

References

Admiralty Mountains
Mountains of Victoria Land
Pennell Coast